is a vibrant part of central Kyoto, Japan where Shijō and Kawaramachi Streets intersect. Kawaramachi Street runs parallel to the Kamo River on the eastern side of Kyoto, while Shijō Street runs east–west through the center of the city.

Stores
Two of four corners of the intersection are occupied by department stores: Takashimaya at the southwest corner and Kyoto Marui at the southeast corner. Kyoto Marui opened on April 27, 2011 replacing Hankyu Department Store, which closed on August 22, 2010.

Railway station
Kyoto-kawaramachi Station is the terminal of the Hankyu Kyoto Line (Hankyu Railway) in Kyoto. The underground station lies beneath the Shijō Kawaramachi intersection. Passengers may change trains from Kyoto-kawaramachi Station to Gion-Shijō Station (Keihan Railway Keihan Main Line), which is located beyond the Kamo River.

The real estate around Kawaramachi station at one time ranked among the most valuable in Japan before the real estate bubble burst in the early '90s.

Currently, the station connects underground to department stores such as Takashimaya, which has an eclectic food market on its basement floor. The station also connects underground to Karasuma Station.

Buses
Kyoto City Bus
Shijo Kawaramachi
Bus stop A
Route 10 for Kitano Tenman-gu, Omuro and Yamagoe via Sanjo Keihan
Route 59 for Kinkaku-ji, Ryōan-ji and Yamagoe via Sanjo Keihan
Kawaramachi Night Bus for Kyoto Station via Kawaramachi Street
Bus stop B 
Route 11 and Route 12 for 
Bus stop C
Route 4, Route 17 and Kawaramachi Night Bus for Kyoto Station via Kawaramachi Street
Shijo-Kawaramachi Shopping Liner for Kyoto Station
Route 80 for  via Gojo Street
Route 205 for Kyoto Station and Kujo Depot via Kawaramachi Street
Bus stop D
Shijo-Kawaramachi Shopping Liner for Kyoto City Hall and Sanjo Keihan
Bus stop E
Route 12 for Kinkaku-ji and Ritsumeikan University
Route 31 for Shijo-Karasuma
Route 32 for Nishikyogoku and Kyoto University of Foreign Studies
Route 46 for Bukkyo University and Kamigamo Shrine via Sembon Street
Route 51 for Kitano Tenman-gu and Ritsumeikan University
Route 201 for Mibu and Sembon Imadegawa
Route 207 for Kyoto Aquarium, Kujo Omiya and Kujo Depot
Bus stop F
Route 3 for Kyoto University of Foreign Studies and Matsuobashi
Route 5 and Gion Night Bus for Kyoto Station via Karasuma Street
Route 11 for Arashiyama, Saga and Yamagoe
Route 203 for Nishioji Shijo and Kitano Hakubaicho
Bus stop G
Route 31 for Takano and Iwakura via Higashiyama Street
Route 46 for Gion and Heian Shrine
Route 201 for Gion and Hyakuman-ben
Route 203 for Gion and Kinrin Depot
Route 207 for Gion and Kujo Depot
100 yen Bus
Bus stop H
Route 4 for Midorogaike and Kamigamo Shrine
Route 205 for Shimogamo Shrine, Rakuhoku High School and 
Bus stop I
Route 17 for Demachiyanagi, Hyakuman-ben, Ginkaku-ji and Kinrin Depot via Kawaramachi Street
Bus stop J 
Route 5 for Osakzaki Park, Kyoto Municipal Museum of Art, the National Museum of Modern Art, Kyoto, Heian Shrine, Nanzen-ji, Eikando, Ginkaku-ji, Kamihatecho Kyoto Zokei University, Shugakuin and Iwakura
Route 32 for Osakzaki Park, Kyoto Municipal Museum of Art, the National Museum of Modern Art, Kyoto, Heian Shrine and Ginkaku-ji
100 yen Bus for Kyoto City Hall
Kyoto Bus
Timetable
Shijo Street (eastbound, for Takano and Ohara)
Route 17 for Ohara via Sanjo Keihan, Demachiyanagi, Takanobashi, Hanazonobashi and 
for Takano Depot via Kawaramachi Sanjo, Demachiyanagi and Takanobashi
Kawaramachi Street (northbound, for Takano and Ohara)
Route 16 starting for Ohara
Route 17 for Ohara
for Takano Depot
Kawaramachi Street (southbound, for Iwakura, Arashiyama and Kyoto Station)
Route 17 for Kyoto Station
Route 21 for Iwakura Jisso-in via Sanjo Keihan, Kawabata Street, Demachiyanagi, Takanobashi, Hanazonobashi and 
Route 23 for Iwakura Jisso-in via Sanjo Keihan, Kawaramachi Street, Demachiyanagi, Takanobashi, Hanazonobashi and Iwakura
Route 41 for Iwakura Muramatsu via Sanjo Keihan, Kawabata Street, Demachiyanagi, Takanobashi, Hanazonobashi and Iwakura
Route 43 for Iwakura Muramatsu via Sanjo Keihan, Kawaramachi Street, Demachiyanagi, Takanobashi, Hanazonobashi and Iwakura
Route 61 for Daikaku-ji via Nijo, Emmachi and Kyoto Studio Park and 
Route 62 for Kiyotaki via Nijo, Emmachi, Kyoto Studio Park and Hankyu Arashiyama
Route 64 for Kiyotaki via Nijo, Emmachi, Kyoto Studio Park, Hankyu Arashiyama and Daikaku-ji
Route 63 for Koke-dera Suzumushi-dera via Nijo, Emmachi, Kyoto Studio Park and Hankyu Arashiyama
Route 65 for Arisugawa via Nijo, Emmachi and Kyoto Studio Park
Keihan Bus
Timetable
for Oyake
for Daigo Bus Terminal
for Yamashina
Daigo Rapid for Daigo-ji
for 
for Sanjo Keihan
for Shijo Karasuma and Shijo Omiya

References

External links

 Kawamachi Station, Hankyu Railway 
 Kyoto Takashimaya 
 Kyoto Marui 

Geography of Kyoto